The Century Boat Company (CEBC) is an American boatbuilding company of racing and pleasure boats. Founded in 1926 in Milwaukee, Wisconsin, it moved to Manistee, Michigan to become a major nationwide supplier. It was taken over by Yamaha in 1995 and sold in 2012 to Allcraft Marine of Florida.

History
The Century Boat Company was founded in 1926 at 333 W Becher Street in Milwaukee, Wisconsin by two brothers, James and William Welch, who excelled in building wooden plank hulls for speed.

In 1928 the company was moved to Manistee, Michigan. By 1937 the company offered 28 models of boats. During World War II, it had a contract to build and deliver 3,600 vessels. It received the Army-Navy "E" Award for excellence in production material. By 1950, the company had 343 authorized dealers and used the marketing slogan "The Thoroughbred of Boats".

In the 1960s, Century introduced  motor yachts and jet-powered boats; in 1967 the last wooden boat rolled out of the Manistee Facility in favor of fiberglass. In the 1970s, the Coronado model was one of the most popular boats in the marketplace. The company operated a fleet of white tractor-trailers to deliver boats from Manistee to its dealerships. In 1983 it opened a production facility in Panama City, Florida.

On March 30, 1990, Century became part of GAC Partners (General Marine) under  Richard Genth. General Marine was looking for investment partners for Century and agreed to use Yamaha outboards. In 1995 Century was purchased by Yamaha, which had purchased Cobia Boats a few months earlier; the new company was called C&C Boats.

In March 2005 Yamaha sold Cobia and stated it would concentrate on the "one brand, one vision" concept. In 2007 alone, Century sold one thousand boats and employees thought that things were on an upswing. But on December 1, 2009, Yamaha announced it was dropping its Century line. Century had at this point had 45 dealers in 18 states. In July, Yamaha stated Century's assets were up for sale. On April 1, 2011 Century Customer Service and Warranty functions were moved to Yamaha Headquarters in Kennesaw, Georgia, while decommissioning and sale of assets of Century Boat Company in Panama City continued. On March 6, 2012, Yamaha announced it had sold Century Boats back to an American company, Allcraft Marine, based at Dawson Drive, Dade City, Florida. Most assets with the exception of the Panama City plant were included in the sale. To continue Century Boat's history and quality construction, the new owners updated the firm's boats.

Allcraft Marine sold a controlling interest in Century Boats to Sorfam Capital in March 2020. Sorfam and its new CEO, Skip Sorenson, invested in brand repositioning, marketing, dealer recruitment, as well as facility enhancements and expansion. Sorfam also added additional product lines through the acquisition of Vanquish Boats in April 2020, a brand offering a similar style to classic Century Boats. The acquired line has been rebranded and named the Coronado, a return to the company's roots. Coronado models include runabouts, cuddys, and dual and center console boats.

Current models
The firm's production facility in Zephyrhills, Florida builds offshore, inshore, and lake boats - suited for fresh and saltwater - and primarily powered by Yamaha outboard engines.

References

External links
Century Boats

American boat builders